Redeemer is Norma Jean's third studio album. It was released on September 12, 2006 in the United States, and on October 3, 2006 in Canada. The album sold more than 21,000 records in its first week. It is the last album to feature drummer Daniel Davison. For this album they filmed videos for "Blueprints for Future Homes", and "Songs Sound Much Sadder". Shannon Crawford, the singer of Cellophane and Monster in the Machine, painted the album artwork.

Track listing

Personnel
Norma Jean
Cory Brandan - vocals, guitars
Scottie Henry - guitars
Chris Day - guitars
Jake Schultz - bass guitar
Daniel Davison - drums
Additional musicians
Matthew Putman - percussion and additional drums
Production
Ross Robinson - mixing
Ryan Boesch - engineering,  mixing
Kale Holmes - assistant engineer
Asterik Studio - art direction, design
Shannon Crawford - album art paintings

Notes
 The song "Blueprints for Future Homes" was the first song to be "released" on their MySpace and Purevolume pages on 7/25/06 at 12:01 AM EST.
 The song "The End of All Things Will Be Televised" was the second song to be "released" on their MySpace and Purevolume pages on 8/4/06 at 12:01 AM EST.
 The song "A Small Spark vs. A Great Forest" was the third song to be released on their Purevolume and MySpace.
 The song "A Small Spark vs. A Great Forest" refers to James 3:5-12 from the New Testament.
 The song "No Passenger: No Parasite" seems to have derived its title and the majority of lyrics from the book "Mere Christianity" by C.S. Lewis, in which Lewis describes a fully Christian society as having "no passengers or parasites".
 The song "Songs Sound Much Sadder" was featured on This is Solid State Vol. 6

References

Norma Jean (band) albums
2006 albums
Tooth & Nail Records albums
Albums produced by Ross Robinson
Century Media Records albums
Post-metal albums
Solid State Records albums